Speers is a borough in Washington County, Pennsylvania, United States. The population was 1,087 at the 2020 census.

Geography

Surrounding and adjacent neighborhoods
Speers has four land borders: with Dunlevy to the southeast, Long Branch to the south-southeast, Twilight from the south to the west, and Charleroi to the northwest.  Across the Monongahela River, Speers runs adjacent with Rostraver in Westmoreland County and Belle Vernon in Fayette County, the former connected by the Belle Vernon Bridge over I-70.

Demographics

As of the census of 2000, there were 1,241 people, 538 households, and 381 families residing in the borough. The population density was 1,285.0 people per square mile (494.0/km2). There were 561 housing units at an average density of 580.9 per square mile (223.3/km2). The racial makeup of the borough was 97.66% White, 0.73% African American, 1.29% Asian, and 0.32% from two or more races. Hispanic or Latino of any race were 0.24% of the population.

There were 538 households, out of which 23.6% had children under the age of 18 living with them, 59.5% were married couples living together, 9.3% had a female householder with no husband present, and 29.0% were non-families. 27.3% of all households were made up of individuals, and 16.2% had someone living alone who was 65 years of age or older. The average household size was 2.31 and the average family size was 2.80.

In the borough the population was spread out, with 17.7% under the age of 18, 6.0% from 18 to 24, 22.2% from 25 to 44, 27.4% from 45 to 64, and 26.7% who were 65 years of age or older. The median age was 47 years. For every 100 females, there were 91.2 males. For every 100 females age 18 and over, there were 89.1 males.

The median income for a household in the borough was $40,500, and the median income for a family was $48,173. Males had a median income of $37,188 versus $30,536 for females. The per capita income for the borough was $20,446. About 5.0% of families and 7.7% of the population were below the poverty line, including 17.3% of those under age 18 and 6.6% of those age 65 or over.

References
Notes

Boroughs in Washington County, Pennsylvania
Populated places established in 1860
Pittsburgh metropolitan area
Pennsylvania populated places on the Monongahela River
1860 establishments in Pennsylvania